Capital punishment has been abolished in Fiji. It abolished capital punishment for ordinary crimes in 1979, and for all crimes in 2015. Its last execution was in 1964, before its independence on 10 October 1970.

References

Fiji
Law of Fiji